Mogra Kalan is a village in Luni tehsil of Jodhpur, India, near National Highway 62 the Pali to Jodhpur route in Rajasthan. The postal code is 342802. According to the 2011 census of India, the population of the village was 4,049 people (2,067 males; 1,982 females).

References

Villages in Jodhpur district